The 2008 VIVA World Cup was the second VIVA World Cup, an international tournament for football, that took place in July 2008. The winners were Padania, who took home the Nelson Mandela Trophy. The tournament was organised by the Nouvelle Fédération-Board.

The defending champions and hosts were Sápmi. The competition, organized by the Sami people, took place from 7 to 13 July, in Gällivare, Sweden.

Qualification
Due to the inaugural status of this tournament, applicants were admitted to the tournament without a qualification process. As an untested tournament the scheduling doesn't meet the organizational capacity of a billion dollar organization like FIFA.

Qualified teams 
The men's teams that took part were:
 (host & holder)

The women's teams that took part were:
 (host)

Venues
As a small tournament, like its European counterpart in Europeada 2008, this VIVA World Cup was not expected to bring in the numbers and financial support of UEFA Euro 2008 earlier this summer; the stadia venues are thus rather small.

The hosts of the games were:
Gällivare Stadium
Malmberget Stadium

Overview
Padania became the 2008 VIVA World Cup champions beating Arameans Suryoye in the final 2–0. The hosts Sapmi, after coming 4th in the group stage, ended by as a lucky 3rd after winning the last edition. The Arameans Suryoye team were the surprise of the tournament qualifying for the final at their first attempt. Iraqi Kurdistan, also debuting, finished 3rd in the group stage but lost in the 4th place play off to Sapmi. To round of the places, in a distant last position, having lost all of their group games, was Provence, a region of France.

In the inaugural women's tournament the hosts Sapmi came through after an aggregate 16–1 thrashing of Iraqi Kurdistan.

Men's results
All times are Central European Summer Time (UTC+2)

Men's First Round

Men's 3/4 place playoff

Men's Final

Women's results
All times are Central European Summer Time (UTC+2)

Top scorers

Men
4 goals
 Stefano Salandra
 Giordan Ligarotti

Women
9 goals
 Gry Keskitalo Skulbørstad

See also
ELF Cup
UNPO Cup
FIFI Wild Cup
KTFF 50th Anniversary Cup
Nouvelle Fédération-Board

References

External links
VIVA Official Site
Gällivare-Malmbergets Fotbollsförening Site 

2008
Viva World Cup, 2008
International association football competitions hosted by Sweden
VIVA